Gordon Richards (23 October 1933 – 17 November 1993) was a Welsh footballer.

Playing career
Richards joined Wrexham as an amateur in 1950 and turned professional two years later. He went on to play almost 100 league matches in the next six years with Wrexham, but by January 1958 he was allowed to move to local rivals Chester after losing his place in the side.

Often a tormenter of Chester's defence when playing against them, Richards helped repay his new employers by scoring on his debut in a 4–2 win against Southport. He played at Sealand Road until a knee injury forced him to leave professional football in 1961, going on to briefly play for GKN Sankey.

Away from football, Richards worked for United Gravel and then Bond Delivery until he took early retirement in 1989.

References

1933 births
1993 deaths
People from Rhosllanerchrugog
Sportspeople from Wrexham County Borough
English Football League players
Association football wingers
Welsh footballers
Wrexham A.F.C. players
Chester City F.C. players
GKN Sankey F.C. players